Kolu Khedi may refer to:

 Kolu Khedi, Huzur, a village in Madhya Pradesh, India
 Kolu Khedi Kalan, a village in Madhya Pradesh, India
 Kolu Khedi Khurd, a village in Madhya Pradesh, India
 Kolu Khedi, Berasia (census code 482280), a village in Madhya Pradesh, India
 Kolu Khedi, Berasia (census code 482219), a village in Madhya Pradesh, India